Telefuture Records is a North American record label located in the central coast of California with retro electronic music such as Synthwave and Chiptune as their main focus.

History
Telefuture Records was founded in 2010 by Steve Jenkins and Frank Martin. With the love for the 80s inspired music that emerged during the 2010s, the label has since then released artists like Makeup and Vanity Set, Arcade High, Garth Knight, Robert Parker, Betamaxx, Waveshaper and Perturbator.

Signed and previous artists
 Rico Zerone
 Mr Nissness
 Linde
 Makeup and Vanity Set
 Garth Knight
 Rolly Mingwald
 Collins
 Betamaxx
 Arcade High
 Ipower
 Vincenzo Salvia
 Nowtro
 Waveshaper
 Troxum
 Perturbator
 Bright Primate
 Protector 101
 Mild Peril
 Le Cassette
 Dead Astronauts
 LPOWER
 Monomer
 Shio-Z
 Marco Maiole
 Remute
 Robert Parker
 Bachelor of Hearts

External links
 
 Telefuture Records official Bandcamp

References

Record labels based in California